James Bruce Llewellyn (July 16, 1927 – April 7, 2010) was an American businessman. His personal wealth has been estimated to exceed $160 million. In 1963, he joined others to found 100 Black Men of America, a social and philanthropic organization. In 1985, he and a group of business partners, among them Julius Erving, Bill Cosby, and Shahara Ahmad-Llewellyn, bought a majority share of the Philadelphia Coca-Cola Bottling Company, the first of the company's bottling plants to be acquired by a black person or persons.

Early life
Llewellyn was born in Harlem in Manhattan, the son of a Jamaican mother and a Guyanese father. Both of his parents came to the United States in 1921. After two years the family moved to Westchester County, settling in White Plains, in a predominantly white middle-class environment, though Llewellyn went to integrated schools. He worked in his father's bar and restaurant and sold magazines and Fuller Brush products. In 1943, Llewellyn joined the US Army, where he served as a first lieutenant.

Family
Llewellyn's sister, Dorothy Cropper, became a judge on the New York State Court of Claims. His middle daughter, Alexandra Marie Llewellyn, was married to Tom Clancy. His wife of 30 years, Shahara Ahmad-Llewellyn, was vice chair of Philly Coke, serves as vice chair of Jazz at Lincoln Center, and was appointed by Michael Bloomberg to the NYC Commission on Women's issues. His youngest daughter, Jaylaan Ahmad-Llewellyn, is a Harvard graduate and founder of Bluhammock Music and Bluhorse Clothes. His mother, Nessa F. Llewellyn, a Jamaican immigrant, lived to be 102. Llewellyn was the brother-in-law of Shahara's sister Sharifa Alkhateeb.  He was also an uncle by marriage to Suzanne de Passe through his second wife Jacqueline.

Education
City University of New York, BS
New York Law School, JD (1960)
Columbia University, MBA 
New York University, MPA

Career
Harlem liquor store, 1952–1956, proprietor 
New York County district-attorney's office, 1958–1960, student assistant 
Evans, Berger, & Llewellyn, 1962–1965 
Housing and Redevelopment Board of New York City, 1964–1965
Small Business Development Corporation, 1965–1967, regional director 
New York City Housing and Development Administration, 1967–1969, Deputy Commissioner of Housing 
Fedco Food Stores, 1969–1984, president 
Freedom National Bank in Harlem, 1971-, board member, 1973-1975 chairman
Overseas Private Investment Corporation, 1977–1981, head
Dickstein, Shapiro, & Morin, 1982–1983, partner
Philadelphia Coca-Cola Bottling Company, 1985–2008, chairman and chief executive officer 
WKBW-TV, 1986–1989, chairman

Awards
Golden Plate Award of the American Academy of Achievement presented by Awards Council member Julius Erving, 1993
Among Black Enterprise magazine's top black business owners, 2001 
Inducted into the Black Entrepreneurs Hall of Fame, 2004
President's Medal of Honor, New York University, 2004
Recipient of more than ten honorary doctorate degrees

Death
Llewellyn died of renal failure at the age 82, in New York City.

References

External links
Mission Statement from 100 Black Men of America
New York Times: J. Bruce Llewellyn, Who Forged a Path For Blacks in Business, Is Dead at 82
Black Enterprise: Former B.E. 100s Business Mogul Passes
Time Magazine: Banking: Relating to the Community (Friday, January 28, 1966)

1927 births
2010 deaths
Deaths from kidney failure
American businesspeople
African-American businesspeople
People from Harlem
American people of Jamaican descent
City College of New York alumni
New York Law School alumni
Columbia Business School alumni
Robert F. Wagner Graduate School of Public Service alumni
20th-century African-American people
21st-century African-American people